Gospel blues (or holy blues) is a form of blues-based gospel music that has been around since the inception of blues music. It combines evangelistic lyrics with blues instrumentation, often blues guitar accompaniment.

According to musician and historian Stefan Grossman, "holy blues" was coined to originally describe Reverend Gary Davis's style of traditional blues playing with lyrics conveying a religious message. Davis and Blind Willie Johnson are considered the genre's two dominant performers, according to Dick Weissman. Other notable gospel-blues performers include Sister Rosetta Tharpe and Washington Phillips.

Blues musicians who became devout, or even practicing clergy, include Reverend Robert Wilkins and Ishman Bracey. Bluesmen such as Boyd Rivers, Blind Lemon Jefferson, Charley Patton, Sam Collins, Josh White, Blind Boy Fuller, Blind Willie Mctell, Bukka White, Sleepy John Estes and Skip James also recorded gospel and religious songs, although these were sometimes released under a pseudonym.

See also 
List of gospel blues musicians

References

External links 
 The Gospel Blues Society

 
Blues
Blues music genres